Abtaha Maqsood (born 11 June 1999) is a Scottish cricketer who currently plays for Sunrisers, Birmingham Phoenix and Scotland as a right-arm leg break bowler. The daughter of immigrants from Pakistan, she was educated at Eastwood High School, Newton Mearns, and plays club cricket for Poloc, having joined them at the age of 11. After only four months at Poloc, she was called up to the Scotland under-17 squad and debuted for them aged 12.

Biography
Maqsood plays cricket wearing a hijab. She has a black belt in taekwondo and was a flag bearer at the 2014 Commonwealth Games in Glasgow. Maqsood played for the Scotland women's national cricket team in the 2017 Women's Cricket World Cup Qualifier in February 2017.

In June 2018, she was named in Scotland's squad for the 2018 ICC Women's World Twenty20 Qualifier tournament. She made her Women's Twenty20 International (WT20I) debut for Scotland against Uganda in the World Twenty20 Qualifier on 7 July 2018.

In May 2019, she was named in Scotland's squad for the 2019 ICC Women's Qualifier Europe tournament in Spain. In August 2019, she was named in Scotland's squad for the 2019 ICC Women's World Twenty20 Qualifier tournament in Scotland. Ahead of the inaugural season of The Hundred, Maqsood was signed by the Birmingham Phoenix, and played for the side again in 2022. In January 2022, she was named in Scotland's team for the 2022 Commonwealth Games Cricket Qualifier tournament in Malaysia. In March 2022, it was announced that Maqsood has signed for Sunrisers for the first part of the 2022 season. Ahead of the 2023 season, it was announced that Maqsood was returning to Sunrisers, this time signing a professional contract with the side.

References

External links
 
 

1999 births
Living people
Scottish women cricketers
Scotland women Twenty20 International cricketers
Scottish people of Pakistani descent
British sportspeople of Pakistani descent
British Asian cricketers
Cricketers from Glasgow
People educated at Eastwood High School, Newton Mearns
Poloc CC players
Birmingham Phoenix cricketers
Sunrisers women's cricketers